Minna Township Stadium (a.k.a. Bako Kontagora Stadium) is a multi-use stadium in Minna, Nigeria.  It is currently used mostly for football matches and is the home stadium of Niger Tornadoes.  The stadium has a capacity of 5,000 people.
Niger State is in the planning stages of expanding the stadium to 30,000. But the stadium look to be in the middle of minna town with no space of expanding. Already houses where carved in all side of the stadium.

External links
DAILY TRIUMPH -Niger plans 30000-capacity stadium
Bako Kontagora Stadium wears new look 

Football venues in Nigeria